North Johns is the second smallest incorporated town in Jefferson County, Alabama (after Cardiff), United States. It is located approximately eight miles southwest from the Birmingham suburb of Hueytown. North Johns was a thriving mining town at the beginning of the 20th century, when more than 2000 people lived in and around the community. It is named after a Welsh-born mining engineer, Llewellyn Johns, who opened coal mining operations throughout the area in the 1880s. At the 2010 census the population was 145, an increase of three persons from 2000.

History
North Johns was incorporated in July 1912, although not until 1930 did it first appear on the Census records. It was listed as Johns in that census and North Johns from 1940 to date. Its peak recorded population was in 1950 when it had 454 residents.

Geography
It is located at  (33.366880, -87.101486).

Demographics

2020 census

As of the 2020 United States census, there were 127 people, 64 households, and 27 families residing in the town.

2000 census
As of the census of 2000, there were 142 people, 51 households, and 37 families residing in the town. The racial makeup of the town was 40.14% White, 59.15% Black or African American and 0.70% Native American.

There were 51 households, out of which 29.4% had children under the age of 18 living with them, 47.1% were married couples living together, 17.6% had a female householder with no husband present, and 25.5% were non-families. 21.6% of all households were made up of individuals, and 2.0% had someone living alone who was 65 years of age or older. The average household size was 2.78 and the average family size was 3.26.

In the town, the population was spread out, with 23.2% under the age of 18, 11.3% from 18 to 24, 23.9% from 25 to 44, 23.9% from 45 to 64, and 17.6% who were 65 years of age or older. The median age was 38 years. For every 100 females, there were 94.5 males. For every 100 females age 18 and over, there were 101.9 males.

The median income for a household in the town was $23,750, and the median income for a family was $33,750. Males had a median income of $35,375 versus $7,083 for females. The per capita income for the town was $8,149. There were 23.1% of families and 31.2% of the population living below the poverty line, including 47.6% of under eighteens and 60.7% of those over 64.

References

Towns in Jefferson County, Alabama
Towns in Alabama
Birmingham metropolitan area, Alabama